Borderline hydrides typically refer to hydrides formed of hydrogen and elements of the periodic table in group 11 and group 12 and indium (In) and thallium (Tl).  These compounds have properties intermediate between covalent hydrides and saline hydrides.  Hydrides are chemical compounds that contain a metal and hydrogen acting as a negative ion.

Properties
Borderline hydrides exhibit bonding characteristics between ionic and covalent bond types. A specific examples of a borderline hydride CuH, copper hydride,  that appears as a spongy reddish-brown substance is a moderate reducing agent. It will catalytically oxidize hypophosphorous acid to phosphorous acid at room temperature, and it gives off hydrogen gas when subjected to heat.
ZnH2 is also a solid at room temperature that breaks down at 90 °C, but even left alone decomposes over several days to zinc metal and hydrogen gas. Hydrogen telluride (H2Te) and hydrogen selenide (H2Se) are both borderline hydrides of high volatility that produce strong, unpleasant odors.

Examples 
 (CuH)n copper hydride
 (ZnH2)n zinc(II) hydride
 HgH2 mercury(II) hydride
 TlH3 thallium hydride

Synthesis
Borderline hydrides are most commonly formed via the acidification or reduction of metal salts.
For instance, copper hydride is formed by reacting copper sulphate and hypophosphorous acid at about 70 °C, forming a yellow precipitate that soon turns red-brown.
Zinc hydride, ZnH2, can be formed by the reduction of either a zinc halide or dimethylzinc.

Alternative definition

A more recent definition of borderline hydrides refers to hydrides that exist between classic and non-classic dihydrides. The classic form is the dihydride M(H)2 configuration, where the metal is bound to two free hydrogen atoms. The non-classic form contains two hydrogen atoms bound to a central metal atom with an η2-H2 hapticity, indicating that a single coordination point on the metal atom bonds to two contiguous atoms from another molecule, in this case H2.  A well-known example of this is from the first such molecule to be synthesized with a coordinated hydrogen ligand (dihydrogen complex): W(CO)3(PPri3)2(η2-H2).
Classic dihydrides containing the dihydride M-(H)2 ligands are typically found as a tautomer with the non-classical dihydrogen complexes containing a M-(η2-H2) group.

Borderline hydrides exist with a bond character somewhere between the classical and non-classical hydrides. Those that are thermally unstable exhibit stretching frequencies νHH greater than 2150 cm1 as a result of poor electron donation from the metal center. An electron dense metal center will yield hydride with a νHH less than 2060 cm1, while anything between is considered to be in the borderline region. Kubas, et al. state that a stretching frequency of 2090 cm1 is within the bounds of stable H2 complexes while 2060 cm1 is right on the borderline between dihydrogen and dihydrides.

References

Metal hydrides